Balham is a commune in the Ardennes department in the Grand Est region of northern France.

The inhabitants of the commune are known as Balhamais or Balhamaises.

The commune has been awarded one flower by the National Council of Towns and Villages in Bloom in the Competition of cities and villages in Bloom.

Geography
Balham is located some 12 km west by south-west of Rethel and 3 km north-east of Asfeld. Access to the commune is by the D926 road from Gomont in the north-east which passes through the village and continues south-west to Asfeld. The commune is mixed forest and farmland.

The Aisne river passes through the centre of the commune flowing from north-east to south-west on its way to join the Oise at Compiègne. The parallel Canal des Ardennes passes through the southern tip of the commune.

Neighbouring communes and villages

Toponymy
The name Balham comes from the name of a person Ballo + Heim. It was Balaan around 1172 and Balehan in 1211–1212.

Heraldry

Administration

List of Successive Mayors

Demography
In 2017 the commune had 152 inhabitants.

Sites and monuments

The Cemetery (15th century) is registered as an historical monument.
The Church of Saint John the Baptist contains several items that are registered as historical objects:
A Stained glass window (1536)
A Statue: Saint Barbe (15th century)
A Statue: Saint Catherine (15th century)

Notable people linked to the commune
Edmond Louis Alexis Dubois-Crancé (1747-1814), Revolutionary politician, member of the Committee of Public Order, General of the Republic, Commissioner of the Army and Minister of War (September–November 1799), became Mayor of Balham after 1800.

See also
Communes of the Ardennes department

References

External links
Balham on Géoportail, National Geographic Institute (IGN) website 
Balham on the 1750 Cassini Map

Communes of Ardennes (department)